The Knife of Never Letting Go is a young-adult science fiction novel written by British-American author Patrick Ness. It was published by Walker Books on 5 May 2008. It is the first book in the Chaos Walking series, followed by The Ask and the Answer and Monsters of Men. The story follows Todd Hewitt, a 12-year-old boy who runs away from Prentisstown, a town where everyone can hear everyone else's thoughts, after learning of a secret about its past.

The novel was celebrated by critics and won annual awards including the Booktrust Teenage Prize, the Guardian Award, and the James Tiptree, Jr. Award. The Knife was Ness's first work for teens and young adults. According to The Guardian coverage of its award, "He turned to children's fiction after he had the idea for a world where it is impossible to escape information overload, and knew it was right for teenagers."

A film adaptation of the novel, simply titled Chaos Walking, was released on 5 March 2021.

Plot summary 
Todd Hewitt is the only boy left in Prentisstown, a small settlement on New World – an alien planet only recently colonized by humanity. Todd is within days of his thirteenth birthday, the age in Prentisstown at which all boys become men.

Todd has been told that all the women and nearly all the men on New World were killed in a war with the Spackle that occurred around the time of his birth. The Spackle are New World's native inhabitants and are blamed for the release of a germ that caused the majority of deaths and was particularly fatal to women. The inhabitants of Prentisstown claim that every Spackle was wiped out during the war, and Todd has no reason to believe otherwise. As a side effect of the virus, the remaining men in Prentisstown can hear each others' (and animals') thoughts, described as an ever-present cascade of what they call Noise.

The men of Prentisstown make up the last surviving settlement on New World – at least according to Mayor Prentiss, after whom the town is named.

At the beginning of the book, Todd and his dog, Manchee, discover a lone patch of silence, described as a "hole in the Noise", in a local swamp. When Todd explains the silence to his adoptive parents, Ben and Cillian, his Noise accidentally projects the discovery to the entire town. Ben and Cillian suddenly reveal they have been planning Todd's escape from Prentisstown for his entire life. The two men immediately force him to leave Prentisstown with just a satchel of supplies and Manchee to accompany him. Todd unwillingly obeys. Cillian fights off the Mayor's son, Davy Prentiss, and other men from the town while Ben gives Todd his own hunting knife and Todd's deceased mother's diary.

Todd escapes into the swamp with Manchee and discovers a girl who lacks Noise. She is the first girl Todd has ever seen, except in videos and photographs. The girl says nothing at all.

Todd, Manchee, and the girl are suddenly attacked by the town preacher, Aaron, who has recently been provoking Todd in physical and mental fights. Todd and Manchee force him into the swamp's lake, where he is attacked by crocodiles. The girl silently leads Todd through the swamp to her scout ship, where her parents' bodies lie dead. She has crash-landed on New World, Todd realises. With aid from a map inside Todd's mother's diary, the three begin traveling together towards Farbranch, a settlement marked on the map. Todd hopes that the settlement still exists and that, if so, it can protect them from Prentisstown.

Todd realises that he, infected with the germ, might transmit the germ to the girl and kill her. She hears this in his Noise and flees, but he pursues her, along with Manchee, until they both encounter Aaron and Prentisstown men who are tracking them at a bridge. The girl manages to save the three by soaking part of the bridge in lighter fluid and setting it on fire with her campfire pack. After this incident, she works up the courage to speak and finally tells Todd her name: Viola.

Todd and Viola are found by a woman from Farbranch named Hildy. She tells Todd that the Noise germ is, in fact, not fatal for women and does not affect them at all – none of the women have Noise. She takes the three to her settlement. At nightfall, an army of men from Prentisstown arrives and burns down the town, killing all those who will not join them. Todd, Viola, and Manchee escape and flee for Haven, where it is rumoured there may be a cure for Noise. They also hope to find a transmitter tower to contact Viola's people, who are a second wave of planetary settlers, to warn them.

After a few days on the road, they are found by Davy. Viola manages to shock Davy. Todd moves to kill him but finds himself unable to follow through. Instead, Todd ties Davy up before heading off for Haven with Viola. During the trip, Todd, Viola, and Manchee find a live Spackle. Todd is shocked, having believed that all Spackle had been killed in the war. Worried at an attack and frustrated with what his feels is cowardice for keeping Davy alive, Todd leaps at the Spackle. He kills it but faces instant regret.

Aaron finds them, stabs Todd, and kidnaps Viola. Todd wakes and hurriedly pursues Aaron, but as his stab wound becomes infected, he quickly weakens. Todd finds Viola and Aaron and, using Manchee as a distraction, he manages to rescue Viola. When the plan is unsuccessful, Todd and Viola manage to get away but are compelled to leave Manchee behind with Aaron, who kills the dog in a fit of rage. The pair flee on a boat, and Todd passes out from his wounds.

Todd wakes up under a care of a doctor in another settlement. Insisting on a walk, he encounters Ben hiding in the outskirts of town. He reveals that Cillian died in Todd's escape from Prentisstown. The people of the new town label Ben as a murderer due to his Prentisstown origins. However, Ben and Todd convince the townsfolk to help them fight the approaching Prentisstown army. As the army approaches, Ben, Todd, and Viola use the confusion to escape.

After gaining some distance, Ben explains the truth: the Noise germ is a natural contagion of the planet, not an attack by the Spackle. The men of Prentisstown, driven mad by Noise and, resenting the women's ability to remain silent, killed all the women and were subsequently banished from the rest of New World for their crimes. The boys were supposed to learn a "version of the truth" from the Mayor on their thirteenth birthday, which is why Ben had sent Todd away; he could be accepted by the rest of the world only if his thoughts were wholly innocent.

Ben, Todd, and Viola continue toward Haven, but Davy finds them again. Ben distracts him to allow Todd and Viola to run, but then the two are cornered by the deranged Aaron in a cavern near a waterfall by Haven. Todd suddenly realises that the Prentisstown process of becoming a man involves murdering someone. Aaron thinks of himself as a symbolic sacrifice for the last boy in Prentisstown and tries to provoke Todd into killing him. Attempting to stop Aaron from succeeding, Viola grabs the knife and stabs Aaron in the neck. He falls into the waterfall and dies.

Davy again intercepts the pair on their way to Haven, shooting Viola. Todd subdues Davy, escapes, and carries a dying Viola to Haven to get help. However, Mayor Prentiss is already there to greet them. After Haven surrendered without a fight, the Mayor declares himself President of New World. Through his despair, Todd realizes that he cannot hear the Mayor's Noise. With no other choice, Todd surrenders to the Mayor to save Viola.

Setting
The Knife of Never Letting Go is set in a town that has been taken over by a small group of religious settlers from Old World, in a town near a swamp. Although the settlers have some advanced technology, they are mostly subsistence farmers. The rural setting has been compared to the worlds of the Adventures of Huckleberry Finn and The Night of the Hunter.

Reception
The Knife of Never Letting Go has received greatly positive reviews. Ian Chipman from Booklist gave the novel a starred review, praising the "pure inventiveness and excitement" of Ness's narrative, and supporting the book's characters, adding that "the cliffhanger ending is as effective as a shot to the gut".

Frank Cottrell-Boyce, writing for The Guardian, praised the novel's opening, and added that the rest of the book "lives up to the thrill of that first sentence". The Sunday Telegraph also praised the book, describing it as "furiously paced, terrifying, exhilarating and heartbreaking" and calling it a book that "haunts your imagination". The Times called it "a stunning debut" and "as compelling as it is original".

Similarly, Nicholas Tucker of The Independent wrote that The Knife of Never Letting Go "sets a high standard", while the Chicago Tribune labelled the novel as "a read-alone, stay-up-way-too-late book".

Awards
 2008 Booktrust Teenage Prize
 2008 Guardian Award
 2008 James Tiptree, Jr. Award

Runners up, etc.
 2009 Carnegie Medal shortlist
 2009 Manchester Book Award longlist

Film adaptation

In 2011, Lionsgate Entertainment bought the rights to adapt the Chaos Walking trilogy for film. The president of Lionsgate, Joe Drake, said the decision was made because "a sense of urgency and momentum permeates these stories – it makes the books ones you can't put down, and will make the movies ones you can't miss on the big screen".

In 2011, it was announced that Chaos Walking: The Knife of Never Letting Go would be produced by Doug Davison while Jamie Linden would be writing and Doug Liman was in negotiations to direct the film. On 5 August 2016 it was announced that Spider-Man and Star Wars stars Tom Holland and Daisy Ridley would both star in the adaptation.

The screenplay was written by Ness, Charlie Kaufman, and John Lee Hancock, and was directed by Doug Liman. Shooting started in August 2017.
The release date was 1 March 2019, but was delayed because of both COVID-19 and reshoots. The film was theatrically released in the US on 5 March 2021.

See also

References

External links

Children's science fiction novels
Guardian Children's Fiction Prize-winning works
2008 British novels
2008 science fiction novels
Novels set on fictional planets
British science fiction novels
British young adult novels
Novels by Patrick Ness
British novels adapted into films
2008 children's books
American novels adapted into films
James Tiptree Jr. Award-winning works
Walker Books books